This is a list of awards and nominations received by American singer, songwriter and producer H.E.R. Academy, Emmy and Grammy Awards winner, H.E.R. has earned numerous awards throughout her career, being mentioned in major international award ceremonies. Since her debut, all three of her recording projects have been nominated for the Grammy Award for Album of the Year.

Her debut compilation, H.E.R., was published in 2017. It was critically acclaimed, winning the Grammy Award for Best R&B Album and the Soul Train Music Award for Album of the Year, while the lead single "Best Part"  with Daniel Caesar was recognized with the Grammy Award for Best R&B Performance. Her second collection, I Used to Know Her (2019), contains the single "Hard Place", which earns the singer her first BET Awards. The same year she was recognized for Outstanding Female Artist at the NAACP Image Awards.

In 2020 H.E.R. publisched the single "I Can't Breathe", which won the Grammy Award for Song of the Year, the Ashford and Simpson Songwriter of the Year Award at the Soul Train Music Awards, while the related video won the Video For Good Award at both the MTV Europe Music Awards and MTV Video Music Awards. The singer first studio album, Back of My Mind, was publisched in 2021 and received critical support. The project, supported by the singles "Damage", "Come Through", and "Slide", earned nominations at the Grammy Award, Soul train Award and NAACP Image Awards.

In 2022 she worked on Mary J. Blige's fourteenth studio album Good Morning Gorgeous, writing and producing the eponymous track of the album, appearing vocally in the remix version. Her contribution to the record project earned her three Grammy nominations, as well as submissions for the NAACP Image Awards and Soul Train Music Awards.

In 2020 H.E.R. wrote, composed and produced "Fight for You", the soundtrack for the film Judas and the Black Messiah. The song won the Academy Award for Best Original Song, the Grammy Award for Best Traditional R&B Performance and was nominated at the Golden Globe and Critics' Choice Movie Awards. Her writing contributions on the animated series We the People earned her a Children's and Family Emmy Award for Outstanding Short Form Program.

Awards and nominations

References

External links
 

Lists of awards received by American musician